The Carnegie Library of Valdosta is a Carnegie library building in Valdosta, Georgia. It was constructed in 1913 for $40,000, with help from a $15,000 Carnegie grant. It was the first building designed by local architect Lloyd V. Greer. It opened in 1914. Decades later it became a branch library and then the base for the Lowndes County Historical Society. It was added to the National Register of Historic Places on January 12, 1984. It is located at 305 West Central Avenue. Originally part of the South Georgia Regional Library, the library building is now home to the Lowndes County Historical Society and Museum.

See also
National Register of Historic Places listings in Lowndes County, Georgia

References

External links
 

Carnegie libraries in Georgia (U.S. state)
Buildings and structures in Lowndes County, Georgia
Libraries on the National Register of Historic Places in Georgia (U.S. state)
Valdosta, Georgia
National Register of Historic Places in Lowndes County, Georgia